Steven Joseph Morley (born August 18, 1981) is a former offensive lineman for the Winnipeg Blue Bombers of the Canadian Football League. He was drafted with the first overall pick in the 2003 CFL Draft by the Calgary Stampeders. He played CIS Football at Saint Mary's.

Morley has also been a member of the Green Bay Packers, Rhein Fire, New York Jets, Seattle Seahawks, Toronto Argonauts and Saskatchewan Roughriders.

Morley background acted in the movie remake of Ice Castles. The director, Donald Wrye, filmed a remake of the movie in 2009. The movie, starring Taylor Firth, is scheduled for release in time for the 2010 Olympics.

The early years 
Steve Morley attended Queen Elizabeth High School in Halifax, Nova Scotia Canada from 1996-1999. In 1996 was named team Rookie of the Year. In 1999 was named team Linemen of the year. Help lead the Lions Football Team to the Provincial Championships in 1998.

Saint Mary's University 
Steve Morley played football for the Saint Mary's University Huskies from 1999-2002. Winning 2 National Championships Vanier Cup in 2001 and 2002. Named AUS J.P. Metras Award Winner in 2002 for being the conference top Linemen.

References

External links
 Winnipeg Blue Bombers bio 
 Roughriders biography

1981 births
Living people
American football offensive linemen
Canadian football offensive linemen
Canadian players of American football
Green Bay Packers players
New York Jets players
Players of Canadian football from Nova Scotia
Saint Mary's Huskies football players
Saskatchewan Roughriders players
Sportspeople from Halifax, Nova Scotia
Toronto Argonauts players
Winnipeg Blue Bombers players